Yamna may refer to:
 Yamna culture, or Yamnaya, Pit Grave, or Ochre Grave culture, early Bronze Age culture on the Russian steppes
 Yamna language, or Sunum, an Austronesian language spoken on the coast and an island of Jayapura Bay in Papua province, Indonesia

People
 Yamna Oubouhou (born 1974)
 Yamna Lobos (born 1983)

See also 
 Yanma
 Jamna (disambiguation)